Potamocypris unicaudata is a species of ostracod crustacean in the family Cyprididae, subfamily Cypridopsinae. It is abundantly found in ditches and ponds near the sea shore, where freshwater slightly mingles with sea water. It is known from both Europe and North America.

Description
The carapace of P. unicaudata is sub-reniform in shape and laterally compressed. The valve surface appears smooth in the stereomicroscope at magnifications of 20 to 60 x. In the scanning electron microscope, at magnifications of 500 x and above, tiny pits become visible.

The carapace length ranges from 0.70 to 0.85 mm. Colour: uniformly green to yellowish green.

The second antennae carry swimming setae distinctly extending beyond the tips of the terminal claws.

Reproduction
No males of P. unicaudata have so far been found and it is therefore inferred that the species reproduces parthenogenetically.

See also
 Potamocypris mastigophora
 Potamocypris steueri
 Potamocypris variegata

References

External links

Cyprididae
Crustaceans described in 1943
Taxa named by Frank Schäfer